Torre de' Negri is a comune (municipality) in the Province of Pavia in the Italian region Lombardy, located about 40 km southeast of Milan and about 15 km east of Pavia.

Torre de' Negri borders the following municipalities: Belgioioso, Corteolona e Genzone, Costa de' Nobili, Spessa.

References

Cities and towns in Lombardy